Masked Raiders is a 1949 American Western film.

It was originally called Trouble in Texas. Filming started 25 April 1949.

Plot

Cast
 Tim Holt as Tim
 Marjorie Lord as Gale Trevett
 Richard Martin as Chito
 Houseley Stevenson as Uncle Henry
 Clayton Moore as Matt
 Frank Wilcox as Corthell 
 Gary Gray as Artie

References

External links
 
 
 
 

1949 films
American Western (genre) films
1949 Western (genre) films
RKO Pictures films
American black-and-white films
Films directed by Lesley Selander
1940s American films